John S. Cate (March 25, 1839 – October 11, 1906) was an American business executive and politician who served as a member of the Massachusetts House of Representatives, a member of the Board of Selectmen, and as Mayor of Everett, Massachusetts.

Early life
Cate was born on March 25, 1839 in Tamworth, New Hampshire.

Business career
Cate was engaged in the manufacture of roofing materials, and was also involved in the real estate business.

Political offices
From 1887 to 1889 Cate served as a member of the Everett, Massachusetts Board of Selectmen.  In 1889 Cate was elected as a Republican, (over Independent Republican Thomas Leavitt who had earlier lost the Republican nomination to Cate), to the Massachusetts House of Representatives.  In the legislature of 1899 Cate served on the Committee on Street Railways.

Death
Cate died, on October 11, 1906, at his summer home in West Ossipee, New Hampshire.

References

1839 births
1906 deaths
Mayors of Everett, Massachusetts
Republican Party members of the Massachusetts House of Representatives
People from Tamworth, New Hampshire
People from Ossipee, New Hampshire
19th-century American politicians